Silvino de Almeida Louro (born 5 March 1959), known simply as Silvino in his playing days, is a Portuguese former footballer who played as a goalkeeper.

Having ended his professional career in his 40s – playing in 21 Primeira Liga seasons and totalling 408 appearances – he went on to have another extensive spell as a goalkeeper or first-team coach, under José Mourinho.

Club career
Born in Setúbal, Silvino started his professional career with hometown's Vitória de Setúbal in 1977, moving to Vitória S.C. after five years at the club.

He was signed by S.L. Benfica for 1984–85, but did not appear once in that year's Primeira Liga, barred by Manuel Bento. After a loan to newly promoted C.D. Aves in the following campaign Silvino returned, going on to have an interesting battle for first-choice status with Neno for several seasons and helping the team win four league titles.

He played in the European Cup finals in 1988 and 1990, having captained the side in the latter. Leaving Benfica in 1994 Silvino rejoined Vitória Setúbal, then moved to FC Porto for the 1995–96 season: despite not having to face Vítor Baía in his second year (after his departure to FC Barcelona) he appeared very rarely in his stint, and closed out his career at northern neighbours S.C. Salgueiros, retiring in June 2000 after three years.

Subsequently, Louro began a career as a goalkeeping coach, successively at Porto, Chelsea, Inter Milan, Real Madrid and Manchester United, always under countryman José Mourinho. Several of the goalkeepers he worked directly with (Baía, Petr Čech and Júlio César) went on to win the Best Goalkeeper award, given by UEFA.

International career

Silvino made his debut for Portugal as a Vitória Guimarães player, in a 0–0 draw with Hungary on 13 April 1983. He won a total of 23 caps in a career spanning 14 years, but was left out of the nation's UEFA Euro 1984 squad.

Silvino returned to the national team on 12 October 1988, and played a major part in their 1990 FIFA World Cup qualifying campaign. He lost the number one shirt in January 1991 to young Baía, as a result of having lost his Benfica job to Neno, and spent the vast remainder of his international career on the substitutes' bench.

However, after Porto's Baía suffered an injury, Silvino played the last two games of the 1998 World Cup qualifiers; his final appearance came in the 1–0 win over Northern Ireland on 11 October 1997 – aged 38 – as he equalised Vítor Damas' record as the oldest player to represent Portugal.

From 2000 to 2002, prior to his Porto appointment, Louro was the goalkeeper coach for the national team.

Honours
Benfica
Primeira Liga: 1986–87, 1988–89, 1990–91, 1993–94
Taça de Portugal: 1984–85, 1986–87, 1992–93
Supertaça Cândido de Oliveira: 1989
European Cup runner-up: 1987–88, 1989–90

Porto
Primeira Liga: 1995–96, 1996–97
Supertaça Cândido de Oliveira: 1996

References

External links

1959 births
Living people
Sportspeople from Setúbal
Portuguese footballers
Association football goalkeepers
Primeira Liga players
Vitória F.C. players
Vitória S.C. players
S.L. Benfica footballers
C.D. Aves players
FC Porto players
S.C. Salgueiros players
Portugal under-21 international footballers
Portugal international footballers
Chelsea F.C. non-playing staff
Manchester United F.C. non-playing staff
Inter Milan non-playing staff
Real Madrid CF non-playing staff
Portuguese expatriate sportspeople in England
Portuguese expatriate sportspeople in Italy
Portuguese expatriate sportspeople in Spain